Steven Sharp (born 22 September 1962) is a former English cricketer.  Sharp was a right-handed batsman.  He was born in Barrow-in-Furness, Lancashire.

Sharp made his debut for Cumberland in the 1982 Minor Counties Championship against Durham.  Sharp played Minor counties cricket for Cumberland from 1982 to 2002, including 65 Minor Counties Championship matches and 19 MCCA Knockout Trophy matches.  In 1986, he made his List A debut against Lancashire in the NatWest Trophy.  He played five further List A matches for Cumberland, the last of which came against Leicestershire in the 1994 NatWest Trophy.  He also played two List A matches for the Minor Counties cricket team in the 1990 Benson and Hedges Cup against Sussex and Derbyshire.  In his eight List A matches, he scored 212 runs at a batting average of 35.33, with a high score of 75.  His only half century for Cumberland came against Essex in the 1992 NatWest Trophy. He also played Second XI cricket for the Lancashire Second XI.

Sharp is chairman of Cumberland County Cricket Club and works as a waste manager at Sellafield.

References

External links
Steven Sharp at ESPNcricinfo
Steven Sharp at CricketArchive

1962 births
Living people
Sportspeople from Barrow-in-Furness
Cricketers from Cumbria
English cricketers
Cumberland cricketers
Minor Counties cricketers